Barr Lake is an unincorporated community in Adams County, in the U.S. state of Colorado. It is located within the Denver metropolitan area.

It is located next to the Barr Lake State Park. 

School District 27J serves Barr Lake. Kids attend Henderson Elementary School and Prairie View Middle School. 

Barr Lake was named for a Mr. Barr, a civil engineer for the Chicago, Burlington and Quincy Railroad. It was originally named Platte Summit.

See also

References

Unincorporated communities in Adams County, Colorado
Unincorporated communities in Colorado
Denver metropolitan area